James Hamilton, 1st Duke of Abercorn, (21 January 1811 – 31 October 1885), styled Viscount Hamilton from 1814 to 1818 and The Marquess of Abercorn from 1818 to 1868, was a British Conservative statesman who twice served as Lord Lieutenant of Ireland.

Background and education
Born into an Ulster-Scots aristocratic family at Seymour Place, Mayfair, on 21 January 1811, Abercorn was the son of James, Viscount Hamilton, himself the eldest son of The 1st Marquess of Abercorn. His mother, Harriet, was the second daughter of The Hon. John Douglas, himself the son of The 14th Earl of Morton. His father died when Abercorn was only three. In 1818, aged seven, he succeeded his grandfather in his titles and estates. He was educated at Harrow School and Christ Church, Oxford, where he matriculated on 2 July 1829.

Political career

Lord Abercorn was first appointed a deputy lieutenant of County Tyrone, where he had a family seat at Baronscourt. On 13 November 1844, Lord Abercorn was appointed Lord Lieutenant of Donegal. The next month, on 12 December 1844, he was made a Knight of the Garter at the relatively young age of 33.

Abercorn was appointed Groom of the Stole to Prince Albert on 8 February 1846, and shortly thereafter, on 25 February 1846, was made a Privy Counsellor. He served as Groom of the Stole until June 1859, and remained a prominent figure in the royal court for the next two decades. He received two honorary degrees during this period, becoming an LL.D. of Cambridge on 5 July 1847, a DCL of Oxford on 4 June 1856. From 11 April 1855 to 22 September 1860, he was honorary colonel of the Donegal Militia, and on 18 February 1860, was commissioned a captain in the newly raised London Scottish Rifle Volunteers.

On 6 July 1866, he was appointed Viceroy of Ireland, under the third ministry of Lord Derby. He retained the post after Derby resigned in February 1868 and Benjamin Disraeli took the reins of the ministry. On 10 August 1868, he was created Marquess of Hamilton and Duke of Abercorn in the Peerage of Ireland. Around this time, he received his third honorary degree, an LL.D. from Trinity College, Dublin. After Gladstone and the Liberals won the 1868 general election, Abercorn resigned the Lord-Lieutenancy on 14 December.

After the formation of the second Disraeli ministry, Abercorn was again appointed Lord Lieutenant of Ireland on 2 March 1874, and was also chosen Grand Master of the Grand Lodge of Ireland, a post he held until his death. He resigned the Lord-Lieutenancy again on 6 December 1876, partly on account of his wife's ill health.

Abercorn was Envoy-Extraordinary for the investiture of King Umberto I of Italy with the Order of the Garter on 2 March 1878. He was elected Chancellor of the University of Ireland in 1881, and died four years later at his home of Baronscourt, County Tyrone on 31 October 1885. He is buried in the cemetery at Baronscourt Parish Church, the traditional burial place of the Dukes of Abercorn and their families.

Family and children
Abercorn married Lady Louisa, second daughter of John Russell, 6th Duke of Bedford, in 1832. They had fourteen children, thirteen of whom survived infancy, among them seven daughters, all of whom were ordered to marry into the peerage and no one beneath the rank of an earl:

Lady Harriet Georgiana Louisa Hamilton (1834–1913), married in 1855 to Thomas George Anson, 2nd Earl of Lichfield. They had eight sons and five daughters.
Lady Beatrix Frances Hamilton (1835–1871), married in 1854 to George Frederick D'Arcy Lambton, 2nd Earl of Durham
Lady Louisa Jane Hamilton (1836–1912), married in 1859 to William Montagu Douglas Scott, 6th Duke of Buccleuch
James Hamilton, 2nd Duke of Abercorn (1838–1913)
Lady Katherine Elizabeth Hamilton (1840–1874), married in 1858 to William Henry Edgcumbe, 4th Earl of Mount Edgcumbe
Lady Georgiana Susan Hamilton (1841–1913), married in 1882 to Edward Turnour, 5th Earl Winterton
Lord Claud Hamilton (1843–1925)
Lord George Hamilton (1845–1927)
Lady Albertha Frances Anne Hamilton (1847–1932), married in 1869 to George Charles Spencer-Churchill, 8th Duke of Marlborough. The marriage was annulled in 1883.
Lord Ronald Douglas Hamilton (1849–1867)
Lady Maud Evelyn Hamilton (1850–1932), married in 1869 to Henry Petty-Fitzmaurice, 5th Marquess of Lansdowne
Lord Cosmo Hamilton (1853–1853, on the same day)
Lord Frederick Spencer Hamilton (1856–1928)
Lord Ernest Hamilton (1858–1939)

Abercorn died in October 1885, aged 74, and was succeeded by his eldest son, James. The Duchess of Abercorn died in March 1905, aged 92.

Ancestry

Notes

References

Dictionary of National Biography

External links

 

|-

1811 births
1885 deaths
19th-century English politicians
Alumni of Christ Church, Oxford
Deputy Lieutenants of Tyrone
101
Knights of the Garter
Lord-Lieutenants of Donegal
Lords Lieutenant of Ireland
Members of the Privy Council of the United Kingdom
Grooms of the Stool
People from Mayfair
English people of Ulster-Scottish descent
London Regiment officers
Military personnel from Middlesex
People educated at Harrow School